On Down the Line is the fourth studio album by American country music artist Patty Loveless. Recorded in Nashville, Tennessee during December 1989/January 1990, it was the follow-up to her breakthrough album, Honky Tonk Angel.

The album was both a critical and commercial success for Loveless, producing two top 10 hits, "On Down the Line" and "I'm That Kind of Girl", and a top 20 hit, "The Night's Too Long".  It peaked at #12 on the Billboard Top Country Album Chart.

Track listing

Personnel
 Richard Bennett - electric guitar on "I'm That Kind of Girl"
 Paul Franklin - Dobro, steel guitar, acoustic slide guitar
 John Barlow Jarvis - keyboards, piano
 Kostas - acoustic guitar on "On Down the Line"
 Albert Lee - electric guitar
 Larrie Londin - drums
 Mac McAnally - acoustic guitar, electric guitar
 Mark O'Connor - fiddle, mandolin
 Leland Sklar - bass guitar

Background vocals
 Vince Gill - background vocals (tracks 1, 3, 5-7)
 Kostas - background vocals (tracks 1, 8, 10)
 Claire Lynch - background vocals (tracks 1, 4, 7)
 Russell Smith - background vocals (track 2)
 Karen Staley - background vocals (track 4)
 Harry Stinson - background vocals (track 3)

Note: Track 9 does not feature backing vocals.

Technical
Chuck Ainlay - recording
Tony Brown - producer
John Guess - mixing
Glenn Meadows - mastering

Charts

Weekly charts

Year-end charts

Certifications

References

1990 albums
Patty Loveless albums
MCA Records albums
Albums produced by Tony Brown (record producer)